Yariel Humberto Rodríguez Yordy (born March 10, 1997) is a Cuban professional baseball pitcher for the Chunichi Dragons of Nippon Professional Baseball. He has played in the Cuban National Series for Ganaderos de Camagüey, and representing the Cuba national baseball team.

Professional career
Rodríguez had previously been linked with the Fukuoka SoftBank Hawks before signing for the Chunichi Dragons on a development deal in January 2020. Rodríguez recorded a 3-4 record and 4.12 ERA in 11 appearances in his first year with Chunichi.

Pitching style
Rodríguez tops out with a 95mp/h fastball.

International career
Rodriguez was part of the Cuba national baseball team at the 2019 WBSC Premier12 tournament. He started the first game of the 2023 World Baseball Classic for Cuba, striking out six and giving up one run in four innings against the Netherlands.

References

External links

 NPB.jp

1997 births
Living people
Chunichi Dragons players
Nippon Professional Baseball pitchers
Cuban expatriate baseball players in Japan
Sportspeople from Camagüey
2023 World Baseball Classic players